Guillermo García López was the defending champion, but was eliminated by eventual finalist Donald Young in the second round.

First seed, Andy Murray, claimed the title, beating Donald Young 6–2, 6–0 in the final.

Seeds
The top four seeds received a bye into the second round.

Draw

Finals

Top half

Bottom half

References
 Main Draw
 Qualifying Draw

Singles
PTT Thailand Open – Singles
 in Thai tennis